Antiguraleus deceptus is an extinct species of sea snail, a marine gastropod mollusk in the family Mangeliidae.

Description

Distribution
This extinct marine species is endemic to New Zealand, and was found in Cenozoic strata.

References

 Powell, Arthur William Baden. The New Zealand Recent and Fossil Mollusca of the Family Turridae: With General Notes on Turrid Nomenclature and Systematics. No. 2 p. 146. Unity Press limited, printers, 1942.
 Powell, A. W. B. "Biological Primary Types in the Auckland Museum: No. 3. Zoological (supplement)." Records of the Auckland Institute and Museum 3.6 (1949): 403-409.
  Maxwell, P.A. (2009). Cenozoic Mollusca. pp 232–254 in Gordon, D.P. (ed.) New Zealand inventory of biodiversity. Volume one. Kingdom Animalia: Radiata, Lophotrochozoa, Deuterostomia. Canterbury University Press, Christchurch.

deceptus
Gastropods described in 1942
Gastropods of New Zealand